Ed Cummings may refer to:

 Bernie S, computer hacker
 Ed Cummings (American football) (born 1941), American football linebacker